Bakiriyya Mosque is a mosque constructed in Sana'a around 1596–97 by the Ottoman governor of Yemen, Hasan Pasha. The mosque fell into disrepair after the Ottomans were driving out of Yemen in 1626 but was fully restored when the Ottomans recaptured Sana'a in 1878.

Description 
The mosque has one minaret and a large prayer hall covered by an Ottoman style dome. Several smaller domed extensions surround the main prayer hall.

Interior 
The minbar and mihrab were made of material imported from Istanbul.

See also
 Islam in Yemen
 List of mosques in Yemen

References

Mosques in Sanaa